El Alma Joven... (English: The Young Soul) is the debut studio album by Juan Gabriel, released in 1971.

Track listing

References

1971 debut albums
Juan Gabriel albums
RCA Records albums
Spanish-language albums